The Light at Tern Rock is a children's novel by Julia Sauer. Illustrated by Georges Schreiber, it was first published in 1951 and received a Newbery Honor award in 1952.

When Ronnie and his aunt agree to take care of the lighthouse at Tern Rock while the keeper takes a break, they do not expect to be spending Christmas there.

See also

Fog Magic, Sauer's other Newbery Honor book

References

1951 American novels
American children's novels
Newbery Honor-winning works
Christmas children's books
1951 children's books